By the Grace of God is the fifth album released by the Swedish rock band The Hellacopters. The CD version of the album came in three different combinations of the red, white and black cloud and lightning design. The design would become a trademark for the band and was used on backdrops, merchandise, different record covers and in music videos. The LP version released in Sweden had a black cover and vinyl while the European version had a white cover and vinyl. Limited edition versions of the album in Japan and America also featured "Red Lights" and the Rory Gallagher song "Big Gun" as bonus tracks. Another special American version also featured an embossed logo, a fold-up digi pack and a patch.

Track listing

Personnel
The Hellacopters;
Nicke Andersson – vocals guitars, piano, percussion
Robert Dahlqvist – guitars, vocals
Kenny Håkansson – bass guitar
Anders Lindström – organ, piano, guitar, backing vocals
Robert Eriksson – drums, backing vocals

Additional musicians
Chuck Ponder – backing vocals
Lars-Göran Petrov – backing vocals
Martin Hederos – piano
Mattias Bärjed – guitar
Jörgen Wall – Timpani

Production
Chips Kiesbye – producer
Michael Ibert – engineer
George Marino – mastering

Charts

Weekly charts

Year-end charts

References

2002 albums
The Hellacopters albums
Albums recorded at Polar Studios